The Players Tour Championship 2011/2012 – Event 10 was a professional minor-ranking snooker tournament that took place between 27 and 30 November 2011 at the World Snooker Academy in Sheffield, England.

David Gray made the 80th official maximum break during his round 2 preliminary match against Robbie Williams. This was Gray's second 147 break. Ricky Walden made the 81st official maximum break during his last 128 match against Gareth Allen. This was Walden's first 147 break.

Michael Holt won his third professional title by defeating Dominic Dale 4–2 in the final.

Prize fund and ranking points
The breakdown of prize money and ranking points of the event is shown below:

1 Only professional players can earn ranking points.

Main draw

Preliminary rounds

Round 1
Best of 7 frames

Round 2
Best of 7 frames

Main rounds

Top half

Section 1

Section 2

Section 3

Section 4

Bottom half

Section 5

Section 6

Section 7

Section 8

Finals

Century breaks
 

 147, 109  Ricky Walden
 147  David Gray
 145  Peter Lines
 142, 103, 102  Ben Woollaston
 134, 131  Ken Doherty
 133  Jimmy Robertson
 132, 106  Tom Ford
 132, 102  Cao Yupeng
 130, 120, 109, 103, 101  Marco Fu
 129, 100  Graeme Dott
 129  Ali Carter
 128  Liu Song
 126  Anthony McGill
 123, 100  Tian Pengfei
 123  Ryan Day
 123  Joe Perry
 121  Martin Gould
 120  Chris Norbury
 120  Neil Robertson
 119  Jamie Cope

 119  Rory McLeod
 119  Stephen Lee
 118  Reanne Evans
 113, 106  Duane Jones
 113, 106  Dave Harold
 113  Dominic Dale
 110, 103  Stephen Maguire
 110  Stephen Hendry
 109  Scott MacKenzie
 108  Fergal O'Brien
 106  Liam Highfield
 105  Andrew Norman
 104  John Higgins
 102  Michael Holt
 102  Sam Baird
 101  Andy Hicks
 101  Nigel Bond
 101  Judd Trump
 100  Jack Lisowski
 100  David Gilbert

References

10
2011 in English sport